The KTDU-425 was a former Soviet liquid fuelled engine designed Aleksei Isaev of the Isayev Design Bureau. It was mainly used on the 4MV bus, which employed it as its main propulsion system. The first version which was the KTDU-425 (11D425), which had a thrust of 18.85kN was first used in 1971 for Mars-2, Mars-3 as well as the failed M-71C (Kosmos 419) probe. This was soon replaced by the KTDU-425A, which had a thrust of 18.89kN. This version was employed on the remaining 4MV and 5VK probes built, as well as Phobos 1 and 2.

Variants 

 KTDU-425 (11D425) - First version of the KTDU-425. Employed in 1971 on M-71 Probes. Thrust: 18.85Kn, Specific Impulse: 312s, Burn time: 520s.
 KTDU-425A (11D425A) - Improved version of KTDU-425. Employed between 1973 and 1989. Thrust 18.89Kn, Specific Impulse: 315s, Burn time: 560s.

References 

Soviet Mars missions
Soviet Venus missions